Patricio Eliseo Morales Gaete (born 13 September 1977) is a Chilean former footballer who played as striker.

References

External links
 Patricio Morales at playmakerstats.com (English version of ceroacero.es)
 

1977 births
Living people
Sportspeople from Concepción, Chile
Chilean footballers
Chilean expatriate footballers
Association football forwards
Naval de Talcahuano footballers
Colo-Colo footballers
Deportes Magallanes footballers
Magallanes footballers
C.D. Huachipato footballers
Lota Schwager footballers
Arema F.C. players
Persik Kediri players
Persebaya Surabaya players
C.D. Arturo Fernández Vial footballers
Deportes Linares footballers
Tercera División de Chile players
Primera B de Chile players
Chilean Primera División players
Segunda División Profesional de Chile players
Liga 1 (Indonesia) players
Chilean expatriate sportspeople in Indonesia
Expatriate footballers in Indonesia